Ramata Diawara (born 24 April 1985) is a Malian former footballer who played as a midfielder. She has been a member of the Mali women's national team.

Club career
Diawara has played for RC Saint-Étienne and FCF Nord-Allier Yzeure in France.

International career
Diawara capped for Mali at senior level during two Africa Women Cup of Nations editions (2002 and 2006).

References 

1985 births
Living people
Malian women's footballers
Women's association football midfielders
AS Saint-Étienne (women) players
Mali women's international footballers
Malian expatriate footballers
Malian expatriate sportspeople in France
Expatriate women's footballers in France
21st-century Malian people